Automatic Thrill is the fifth and last album released by the Norwegian band Gluecifer.

Track listing 
"Automatic Thrill" - 3:26
"Take It" - 2:45
"Car Full of Stash" - 3:15
"Here Come the Pigs" - 3:33
"Dingdong Thing" - 2:41
"A Call from the Other Side" - 2:52
"Shaking So Bad" - 3:49
"Freeride" - 3:45
"Put Me on a Plate" - 2:44
"Dr. Doktor" - 2:37
"The Good Times Used to Kill Me" - 4:45

2004 albums
Gluecifer albums